North Gippsland or variation, may refer to:

North Gippsland, a geographic region of the Australian state of Victoria
Electoral district of Gippsland North of the Victorian Legislative Assembly for the state of Victoria in Australia
North Gippsland Football League (Australian rules football)

See also

 
 
 Gippsland (disambiguation)